Babiyal is a census town in Ambala district in the state of Haryana, India.

Demographics
 India census, Babiyal had a population of 21,650. Males constitute 52% of the population and females 48%. About 12% of the population is under 6 years of age.

References

Cities and towns in Ambala district